The Prix des Deux Magots is a major French literary prize. It is presented to new works, and is generally awarded to works that are more off-beat and less conventional than those that receive the more mainstream Prix Goncourt.

The name derives from the extant Parisian café "Les Deux Magots", which began as a drapery store in 1813, taking its name from a popular play of the time, "The two  figurines of China". It housed a wine merchant in the 19th century, and was refurbished in 1914 into a café.

Winners 

1933: Raymond Queneau Le Chiendent
1934: Georges Ribemont-Dessaignes Monsieur Jean ou l'Amour absolu
1935: Jacques Baron Charbon de Mer
1936: Michel Matveev Étrange Famille
1937: Georges Pillement Plaisir d'Amour
1938: Pierre Jean Launay Léonie la Bienheureuse
1941: J. M. Aimot Nos mitrailleuses n'ont pas tiré
1942: Olivier Séchan Les Corps ont soif
1944: Jean Milo L'Esprit de famille
1946: Jean Loubes Le Regret de Paris
1947: Paule Malardot L'Amour aux deux visages
1948: Yves Malartic Au Pays du Bon Dieu
1949: Christian Coffinet Autour de Chérubine
1950: Antoine Blondin L'Europe buissonnière
1951: Jean Masarès Le Pélican dans le désert
1952: René-Jean Clot Le Poil de la Bête
1953: Albert Simonin Touchez pas au grisbi
1954: Claude Cariguel S
1955: Pauline Réage Histoire d'O
1956: René Hardy Amère Victoire
1957:  Grain de Beauté
1958: Michel Cournot Le Premier Spectateur
1959: Henri-François Rey La Fête Espagnole
1960: Bernard-G. Landry Aide-mémoire pour Cécile
1961: Bernard Jourdan Saint-Picoussin
1962:  Le notaire des noirs
1963:  
1964: Clément Lépidis La Rose de Büyükada
1965: Fernand Pouillon Les Pierres sauvages
1966: Michel Bataille Une Pyramide sur la mer
1967: Solange Fasquelle L'Air de Venise
1968: Guy Sajer Le soldat oublié
1969: Elvire de Brissac A Pleur-Joie
1970: Roland Topor Joko fête son anniversaire
1971: Bernard Frank Un siècle débordé
1972: Alain Chedanne Shit, Man
1973: Michel del Castillo Le Vent de la nuit
1974: André Hardellet Les Chasseurs Deux
1975: Geneviève Dormann Le Bateau du courrier
1976: François Coupry Mille pattes sans tête
1977: Inès Cagnati Génie la folle
1978: Sébastien Japrisot L'Eté meurtrier
1979: Catherine Rihoit  Le bal des débutantes
1980: Roger Garaudy L'appel des vivants
1981: Raymond Abellio Sol Invictus
1982: François Weyergans Macaire le Copte
1983: Michel Haas La dernière mise à mort
1984: Jean Vautrin Patchwork
1985: Arthur Silent Mémoires minuscules
1986: Éric Deschodt Eugénie les larmes aux yeux and Michel Breitman Témoin de poussière
1987: Gilles Lapouge La bataille de Wagram
1988: Henri Anger  La mille et unième rue
1989: Marc Lambron L'impromptu de Madrid
1990: Olivier Frébourg, Roger Nimier
1991: Jean-Jacques Pauvert, Sade
1992: Bruno Racine, Au péril de la mer
1993: Christian Bobin, Le Très-Bas
1994: Christophe Bataille, Annam
1995: Pierre Charras, Monsieur Henry
1996: Éric Neuhoff, Barbe à Papa
1997: Ève de Castro, Nous serons comme des Dieux
1998: Daniel Rondeau, Alexandrie and  Je suis le gardien du phare
1999: Marc Dugain, La Chambre des officiers
2000: Philippe Hermann, La vraie joie
2001: François Bizot,  Le Portail
2002: Jean-Luc Coatalem, Je suis dans les mers du Sud
2003: Michka Assayas,  Exhibition
2004: Adrien Goetz,  La Dormeuse de Naples
2005: Gérard Oberlé,  Retour à Zornhof
2006: Jean-Claude Pirotte, Une adolescence en Gueldre
2007: Stéphane Audeguy,  Fils unique
2008: Dominique Barbéris, Quelque chose à cacher
2009: Bruno de Cessole, L'heure de la fermeture dans les jardins d'Occident
2010: Bernard Chapuis, Le Rêve entouré d'eau
2011: Anthony Palou, Fruits & légumes
2012: Michel Crépu, Le Souvenir du monde
2013: Pauline Dreyfus, Immortel, enfin
2014: Étienne de Montety, La Route du salut
2015: Serge Joncour, L'Écrivain national 	
2016: , La Piste Pasolini
2017: Kéthévane Davrichewy, 
2018: Julie Wolkenstein, Les vacances 
2019: , Le Temps de s'en apercevoir
2020: Jérôme Garcin, 
2021: Emmanuel Ruben, Sabre
2022: Louis-Henri de La Rochefoucauld, Châteaux de Sable

References

 Noël Blandin, "Prix des Deux Magots", La République des Lettres, 20 January 2010

External links 
 Prix des Deux Magots article from www.prix-litteraires.net
  (in French)

Deux Magots
Awards established in 1933
Prix des Deux Magots winners
1933 establishments in France